Otomesostoma is a genus of flatworms belonging to the family Otomesostomatidae.

Species:
 Otomesostoma auditivum (Du Plessis, 1874)

References

Rhabditophora
Rhabditophora genera